Davy Run is an unincorporated community located in Carter County, Kentucky, United States. It was also known as the Davy Mines.

References

External links
History of Davy Run

Unincorporated communities in Carter County, Kentucky
Unincorporated communities in Kentucky